Mary Lou  Mackey (born 1945) is an American novelist, poet, and academic. She is the author of eight collections of poetry and fourteen novels, including the New York Times best-seller A Grand Passion and The Village of Bones, The Year The Horses Came, The Horses At The Gate, and The Fires of Spring, four sweeping historical novels that take as their subject the earth-centered, Goddess-worshiping cultures of Neolithic Europe. In 2012, her sixth collection of poetry, Sugar Zone, won a PEN Oakland/Josephine Miles Literary Award. Another collection, The Jaguars That Prowl Our Dreams: New and Selected Poems 1974 to 2018, won a 2018 Women’s Spirituality Book Award from the California Institute of Integral Studies; and the 2019 Eric Hoffer Small Press Award for the best book published by a small press. Her first novel, Immersion (Shameless Hussy Press, 1972), was the first novel published by a Second Wave feminist press. Long concerned with environmental issues, Mackey frequently writes about the rainforests of Costa Rica and the Brazilian Amazon. In the early 1970s, as Professor of English and Writer-In-Residence at California State University, Sacramento,  she was instrumental in the founding of the CSUS Women's Studies Program and the  CSUS English Department Graduate Creative Writing Program.  From 1989-1992, she served as President of the West Coast Branch of PEN American Center involving herself in PEN's international defense of persecuted writers.

Biography

Mary Mackey was born in Indianapolis, Indiana. Her father was a physician. Her mother worked as a chemist in the Mead Johnson laboratories during World War II. Mackey graduated from Harvard College magna cum laude with a major in English. While there, she came under the influence of the father of modern ethnobotany, Richard Evans Schultes, to whom she attributes a lifelong interest in botany and ecology, themes which often appear in her novels and poetry.  During her twenties, she lived in field stations in the then-remote jungles of Costa Rica. After receiving her Ph.D. in Comparative Literature from the University of Michigan, she moved to California to become Professor of English and Writer-in-Residence at California State University, Sacramento (CSUS). She is married to Angus Wright, CSUS Emeritus Professor of Environmental Studies, with whom she frequently travels to Brazil.

Mackey was one of the founders of the CSUS Women's Studies Program.  She also founded the CSUS English Department Graduate Creative Writing Program along with poet Dennis Schmitz and novelist Richard Bankowsky. In 1978 Mackey founded The Feminist Writers' Guild with poets Adrienne Rich and Susan Griffin, author Charlene Spretnak, and novelist Valerie Miner.  From 1989-1992, Mackey served as President of the West Coast Branch of PEN American Center involving herself in PEN's international defense of persecuted writers.  Mackey retired from California State University in 2008. As of 2020, she continues to write novels and poetry.

Works

Mackey is the author of fourteen novels and eight collections of poetry. She is noted for her historical fiction, particularly for The Village of Bones, The Year The Horses Came, The Horses At The Gate, and The Fires of Spring, a series set in Neolithic Europe which Mackey based on the research of archaeologist Marija Gimbutas. She is also noted for her lyric poetry which has been praised by Wendell Berry, Jane Hirshfield, Maxine Hong Kingston, Dennis Nurkse, Ron Hansen, Dennis Schmitz, and Marge Piercy for its beauty, precision, originality, and extraordinary range.

Her first novel, Immersion (Shameless Hussy Press, 1972) is set in the rain forests of Costa Rica. It takes as its subjects ecology and feminism, and is believed to be the first feminist novel published by a Second Wave American feminist press.  McCarthy’s List is a comic novel set in Indianapolis in the 1950s. The Last Warrior Queen retells the myth of Inanna, the Sumerian goddess of sexual love, fertility, and warfare. A Grand Passion and The Kindness of Strangers are set in Europe and take as their subject three generations of women involved in the arts. Four of Mackey's novels  (The Village of Bones, The Year The Horses Came, The Horses At The Gate, and The Fires of Spring) comprise her Earthsong Series. Set in Europe in the Neolithic Period, they deal with struggles between matristic earth-centered goddess-worshiping cultures and invading patriarchal nomads.  Mackey's Season of Shadows is set at Harvard in the late 60's and deals with various political issues such as the Civil Rights Movement and protests against the United States' involvement in the Vietnam War.  In 2003 and 2004, in a departure from her previous styles and themes, Mackey chose to write The Stand-In and Sweet Revenge under the pen name "Kate Clemens." Both are comic novels set in Los Angeles. She wrote two Civil War novels, The Notorious Mrs. Winston and The Widow’s War, which are set in Indiana and Kansas, respectively.

Mackey's poetry is hard to classify. Critics have called it "fierce," "surreal," "ecstatic," "passionately transcendent," and "corrosive," and noted her "hallucinatory troping" which is "continually deconstructing rational consciousness."  In speaking of Mackey's collection Breaking The Fever, poet Jane Hirshfield noted: "The poetry in Breaking the Fever offers truths both personal & political, visions both actual and imaginatively broad …, set down with a sensuous, compassionate, and utterly unflinching eye."  On several occasions, Garrison Keillor read Mackey's poems on his daily radio show and podcast The Writer’s Almanac.  In 2011, Marsh Hawk Press published Mackey's sixth collection of poetry, Sugar Zone which won the 2012 PEN Oakland/Josephine Miles Literary Award. Her eighth collection, The Jaguars That Prowl Our Dreams: New and Selected Poems 1974 to 2018, won a Women’s Spirituality Book Award from the California Institute of Integral Studies; and the Eric Hoffer Small Press Award for the best book published by a small press. Mackey has said that many of her poems are inspired by the extremely high fevers she has experienced on multiple occasions and by the works of Brazilian novelists and poets, noting that often they "combine Portuguese and English as incantation to evoke the lyrical space that lies at the conjunction between the two languages." In 2014 Marsh Hawk published a new collection of Mackey's poetry Travelers With No Ticket Homeabout which The Huffington Post said: "It is difficult to resist the temptation to compare Mary Mackey to Elizabeth Bishop. Both poets are stunningly imagistic and musical." In 2018, when Mackey’s The Jaguars That Prowl Our Dreams: New and Selected Poems 1974 to 2018 was published, PANK magazine noted that: “Mackey is a magnificent thinker with broad passions: pagan cultures, literature, anthropology, ecology and history ... [whose] work, while stunningly layered, is always accessible.” “Mary Mackey,” said Tulsa Book Review, “is a national treasure. Her poetry resonates with feminism and the world of nature without any trace of didacticism. This is her eighth collection of poetry, and we are better for it.”

Mary Mackey’s literary papers are archived in the Sophia Smith Special Collections Library, Smith College, Northampton, MA. Her collection of rare editions of small press poetry books authored by Northern California poets is archived in the Smith College Mortimer Rare Book Room.

Novels

 Immersion, San Lorenzo, CA: Shameless Hussy Press (1972)
 McCarthy’s List, New York, NY: Doubleday (1979)
 The Last Warrior Queen, New York, NY: Putnam (1983)
 A Grand Passion, New York, NY: Simon & Schuster (1986)
 The Kindness of Strangers, New York, NY: Simon & Schuster (1988)
 Season of Shadows, New York, NY: Bantam Books (1991)
 The Year The Horses Came, San Francisco, CA: Harper San Francisco (1993)
 The Horses At The Gate, San Francisco, CA: Harper San Francisco (1996)
 The Fires of Spring, New York, NY: Penguin (1998)
 The Stand-In (under the pen name "Kate Clemens"), New York, NY: Kensington Books (2003)
 Sweet Revenge (under the pen name "Kate Clemens"), New York, NY: Kensington Books (2004)
 The Notorious Mrs. Winston, New York, NY: Berkley Books (2007)
 The Widow’s War, New York, NY: Berkley Books (2009)
 The Village of Bones: Sabalah’s Tale, New York, NY: Lowenstein Associates (2016)

Poetry collections

 Split Ends, Berkeley, CA: Ariel Press (1974)
 One Night Stand, Emeryville, CA: Effie's Press (1976)
 Skin Deep, Washington, DC: Gallimaufry Press (1978)
 The Dear Dance of Eros, Seattle WA: Fjord Press (1987)
 Breaking The Fever, New York, NY: Marsh Hawk Press (2006)
 Sugar Zone, New York, NY: Marsh Hawk Press (2011)
 Travelers With No Ticket Home, New York, NY: Marsh Hawk Press (2014)
 The Jaguars That Prowl Our Dreams: New and Selected Poems 1974 to 2019 (With an Introduction by D. Nurske), New York, NY: Marsh Hawk Press (2018)

Other works

 Silence (original screenplay). Film directed by John Korty (1974)
 McCarthy’s List  (screenplay, adaptation of Mackey's novel). Warner Brothers (1980)
 Good Behavior (original screenplay co-authored with Ray Fox), (1982)
 The Spy (original screenplay, short subject, co-authored with Renée de Palma). Film directed by de Palma (2000)
 Creativity: Where Poems Begin, New York, NY: Marsh Hawk Press (2022)

Awards and honors
2022 City of Angels Women's Film Festival Award for Best Short Film Script for Time Piece
Eric Hoffer Small Press Award for The Jaguars That Prowl Our Dreams: New and Selected Poems 1974 to 2018
2012 PEN Oakland/Josephine Miles Award for Literary Excellence for Sugar Zone.
California Institute of Integral Studies Women's Spirituality Book Award for The Jaguars That Prowl Our Dreams: New and Selected Poems 1974 to 2018, 2018
 California Institute of Integral Studies Women's Spirituality Book Award for The  Village of Bones: Sabalah's Tale, 2018

Notes

References

External links
 
 Garrison Keillor reading Mackey's poetry:
 http://writersalmanac.publicradio.org/index.php?date=2007/02/15
 http://writersalmanac.publicradio.org/index.php?date=2007/02/16
 http://writersalmanac.publicradio.org/index.php?date=2011/02/21
 Mary Mackey papers at the Sophia Smith Collection, Smith College Special Collections

Living people
American women poets
20th-century American novelists
21st-century American novelists
American women novelists
California State University, Sacramento faculty
Harvard College alumni
University of Michigan alumni
20th-century American poets
21st-century American poets
20th-century American women writers
21st-century American women writers
Writers from Indianapolis
PEN Oakland/Josephine Miles Literary Award winners
Novelists from Indiana
American historical novelists
Women historical novelists
Writers of fiction set in prehistoric times
1945 births
Poets from California
Writers from the San Francisco Bay Area
Climate activists